Murder on the Orient Express is a work of detective fiction by English writer Agatha Christie featuring the Belgian detective Hercule Poirot. It was first published in the United Kingdom by the Collins Crime Club on 1 January 1934. In the United States, it was published on 28 February 1934, under the title of Murder in the Calais Coach, by Dodd, Mead and Company. The UK edition retailed at seven shillings and sixpence (7/6) and the US edition at $2.

The elegant train of the 1930s, the Orient Express, is stopped by heavy snowfall. A murder is discovered, and Poirot's trip home to London from the Middle East is interrupted to solve the case. The opening chapters of the novel take place primarily in Istanbul. The rest of the novel takes place in Yugoslavia, with the train trapped between Vinkovci and Brod.

The US title of Murder in the Calais Coach was used to avoid confusion with the 1932 Graham Greene novel Stamboul Train, which had been published in the United States as Orient Express.

Plot

After taking the Taurus Express from Aleppo to Istanbul, private detective Hercule Poirot arrives at the Tokatlian Hotel, where he receives a telegram prompting him to return to London. He instructs the concierge to book him a first-class compartment on the Simplon-route Orient Express  service leaving that night. Although the train is fully booked, Poirot obtains a second-class berth through the intervention of friend, fellow Belgian, and fellow passenger Monsieur Bouc, director of the train operator Compagnie Internationale des Wagons-Lits (CIWL). Other passengers include American widow Caroline Hubbard; English governess Mary Debenham; Swedish missionary Greta Ohlsson; American businessman Samuel Ratchett, with his secretary/translator Hector MacQueen, and his English valet Edward Henry Masterman; Italian-American car salesman Antonio Foscarelli; Russian Princess Natalia Dragomiroff and her German maid Hildegarde Schmidt; Hungarian Count Rudolph Andrenyi and his wife Elena; English Colonel John Arbuthnot; American salesman Cyrus B. Hardman; and Greek medical doctor Stavros Constantine.

Ratchett has been receiving death threats; recognizing Poirot, he tries to hire him for protection. Poirot, repulsed by Ratchett, refuses, telling him, "I will not take your case because I do not like your face." Bouc has taken the last first-class cabin, but on the first morning he arranges to move to a separate coach and gives Poirot his space. That night, Poirot observes some strange occurrences. Early in the morning, he is awakened by a cry from Ratchett's compartment next door. Pierre Michel, the train's conductor, knocks on Ratchett's door, but a voice from inside responds, "Ce n'est rien. Je me suis trompé." ("It is nothing. I was mistaken.") Hubbard rings her bell and tells Michel a man passed through her room. When Poirot rings his bell for water, Michel informs him that the train is stuck in a snowdrift between Vinkovci and Brod before he hears a loud thump next door. He observes a woman in a red kimono going towards the washroom, then goes to sleep.

The next morning, with the train still stalled, Bouc informs Poirot that Ratchett has been murdered and the murderer is still aboard, having no way to escape in the snow. As there are no police onboard, Poirot takes up the case. With help from Constantine, Poirot examines Ratchett's body and compartment, discovering the following: the body has twelve stab wounds, the window had been left open, a handkerchief with the initial "H", a pipe cleaner, a flat match different from the ones Ratchett used, and a charred piece of paper with "member little Daisy Armstrong" written on it.

The piece of paper helps Poirot work out the murderer's motive. Many years earlier, American gangster Cassetti kidnapped three-year-old Daisy Armstrong. Cassetti collected a significant ransom from the wealthy Armstrong family, then revealed that he had already killed the child. Sonia Armstrong, Daisy's mother, who was pregnant with her second child, went into premature labor upon hearing the news and died, along with the baby. Her grieving husband, Colonel Armstrong, shot himself, and Daisy's French nursemaid, Susanne, was accused of aiding Cassetti and committed suicide, only to be found innocent afterwards. Cassetti escaped justice through corruption and legal technicalities, and fled the country. Poirot concludes that "Ratchett" was actually Cassetti. Whoever had answered the conductor was not Ratchett, as Ratchett did not speak French.

As Poirot begins interviewing everyone on the train, he discovers MacQueen is directly involved as he knows about the Armstrong note and believed it was destroyed and that Hubbard believes the murderer was in her cabin. While the passengers and Pierre all provide suitable alibis for each other, Poirot notes that some of them observed the woman in the red kimono walking down the hallway on the night of the murder. However, no one admits to owning a red kimono. Hubbard had Ohlsson lock the communicating door between her compartment and that of Cassetti, which invalidates her story of the man in her compartment, and Schmidt bumped into a stranger wearing a Wagons-Lits uniform. Miss Debenham inadvertently reveals she has been to America, contrary to her earlier statements, and Ohlsson shows much emotion when the subject of Daisy is brought up, causing further suspicion. Arbuthnot remarks that Cassetti should have been found guilty in a second trial instead of murdered, and Hardman admits he is actually a MacNeil Agency private detective who was asked to watch out for an assassin that was stalking Cassetti.

While inspecting the passengers' luggage, Poirot is surprised to find the label on Countess Andrenyi's luggage is wet and that her passport is smudged, Schmidt's bag contains the uniform in question, and Poirot's own luggage contains the red kimono, recently hidden there. Hubbard herself finds the murder weapon hidden in her sponge bag. Poirot meets with Constantine and Bouc to review the case and develop a list of questions. With these and the evidence in mind, Poirot thinks about the case, going into a trance-like state. When he surfaces from it, he deduces the solution.

He calls in the suspects and reveals their true identities and that they were all connected to the Armstrong tragedy in some way, gathering them in the dining car for the second solution. Countess Andrenyi (nee Goldenberg) is Helena, Daisy's aunt, who was a child herself at the time of the tragedy. Rudolph, her loving husband, smudged her luggage label and obscured her name to conceal her identity. Debenham was Helena and Daisy's governess; Foscarelli was the Armstrongs' chauffeur and a suspect in the kidnapping; Masterman was Col. Armstrong's valet; Michel is Susanne's father and the person who procured the false second uniform; Hubbard is actually  actress Linda Arden (Daisy's grandmother and Sonia and Helena's mother); Schmidt was the Armstrongs' cook; and Ohlsson was Daisy's nurse. Princess Dragomiroff, in reality Sonia's godmother, claims the monogrammed handkerchief, saying that her forename is Natalia and the "H" is actually a Cyrillic letter "N". Arbuthnot is there on Debenham's behalf and his own, as he was a personal friend of Colonel Armstrong. Hardman is an ex-policeman who admits he was in love with Susanne, and MacQueen, who had feelings for Sonia, was the son of the lawyer who represented the Armstrongs. The only passengers not involved in the murder are Bouc and Constantine, both having slept in the other coach, which was locked.

Poirot propounds two possible solutions, one far simpler than the other, and advising them to consider both seriously. The first is that a stranger boarded the train when it stopped at Vinkovci, killed Cassetti as a result of a Mafia feud, and disembarked at great risk through the snow. The second is that all the clues except the handkerchief and pipe cleaner were planted and that Michel and all the passengers in the coach, except Helena, stabbed Cassetti, acting as their own jury. Arden acknowledges everything and  offers to take responsibility as she was the mastermind. Bouc and Constantine, however, decide the first solution should be relayed to the police. Poirot retires from the case.

Characters
Hercule Poirot – World-famous sleuth from Belgium.
Bouc – Poirot's friend and a director of the Compagnie Internationale des Wagons-Lits.
Dr. Stavros Constantine - a Greek physician, who after the murder, determines Ratchett's time of death.
Mrs. Caroline Hubbard - Grandmother of Daisy Armstrong who is later revealed to be actress Linda Arden.
Mary Debenham – A governess returning from Baghdad who was formerly Daisy Armstrong's governess.
Colonel John Arbuthnot – Colonel Armstrong's best friend who is in love with Mary Debenham.
Princess Natalia Dragomiroff – a Russian princess who is ultimately revealed to be Sonia Armstrong's godmother. 
Hector MacQueen – Ratchett's personal secretary and translator, whose father was the lawyer for the Armstrong family.
Samuel Ratchett  – AKA Cassetti, kidnapper and murderer of three-year-old Daisy Armstrong.
Countess Helena Andrenyi – the sister of Sonia Armstrong, notable as the only one of the 12 passengers who did not take part in the murder.
Count Rudolph Andrenyi – husband of Countess Andrenyi, who took his wife's place as the twelfth murderer.
Cyrus Hardman – an ex-American Policeman who was in love with Daisy's French nurse, who committed suicide after Daisy was killed. 
Antonio Foscarelli – the Armstrongs' former chauffeur who had loved little Daisy.
Greta Ohlsson – Daisy Armstrong's former nurse.
Hildegarde Schmidt – Princess Dragomiroff's maid, formerly the Armstrongs' cook
Edward Henry Masterman – Ratchett's valet, a remote and haughty man, who was Col. Armstrong's batman in the war and valet in New York.
Pierre Michel – the train conductor and the father of Daisy Armstrong's nursery maid, who committed suicide after the murder.

Reception
The Times Literary Supplement of 11 January 1934 outlined the plot and concluded that "The little grey cells solve once more the seemingly insoluble. Mrs Christie makes an improbable tale very real, and keeps her readers enthralled and guessing to the end."

In The New York Times Book Review of 4 March 1934, Isaac Anderson wrote, "The great Belgian detective's guesses are more than shrewd; they are positively miraculous. Although both the murder plot and the solution verge upon the impossible, Agatha Christie has contrived to make them appear quite convincing for the time being, and what more than that can a mystery addict desire?"

The reviewer in The Guardian of 12 January 1934 noted that the murder would have been "perfect" (i.e. a perfect crime) had Poirot not been on the train and also overheard a conversation between Miss Debenham and Colonel Arbuthnot before he boarded; however, Poirot's "'little grey cells' worked admirably, and the solution surprised their owner as much as it may well surprise the reader, for the secret is well kept and the manner of the telling is in Mrs Christie's usual admirable manner."

Robert Barnard said that this novel was "The best of the railway stories. The Orient Express, snowed up in Yugoslavia, provides the ideal 'closed' set-up for a classic-style exercise in detection, as well as an excuse for an international cast-list. Contains my favourite line in all Christie: 'Poor creature, she's a Swede.' Impeccably clued, with a clever use of the Cyrillic script (cf. The Double Clue).  The solution raised the ire of Raymond Chandler, but won't bother anyone who doesn't insist his detective fiction mirror real-life crime." The reference is to Chandler's criticism of Christie in his essay, The Simple Art of Murder. In 1995, the novel was included in Mystery Writers of America's The Top 100 Mystery Novels of All Time list. In December 2014, the novel was included in Entertainment Weekly'''s list of the Nine Great Christie Novels.

References and allusions

The kidnapping and murder of Charles Lindbergh's son in 1932 inspired that element in Christie's novel two years later. The novel used many elements of the real life case: a young child, firstborn of the family, was kidnapped for ransom directly from the crib, the parents were famous, the father was a well-known pilot and the mother pregnant, and the ransom was paid but the child found dead soon after. An innocent, but perhaps loose-lipped, maid employed by Lindbergh's parents was suspected of involvement in the crime. After being harshly interrogated by police, she committed suicide.

Two less notable events helped inspire her novel: Agatha Christie's first journey on the Orient Express in late 1928, and a blizzard near Çerkezköy, Turkey, that marooned the Orient Express for six days just a few months later, in February 1929.

Flooding from rainfall that washed sections of track away in December 1931 halted Christie's return from her husband's archaeological dig at Nineveh aboard an Orient Express for 24 hours. Her authorised biography details that event in a complete quotation of a letter to her husband, which describes several passengers on her train who inspired both the plot and the characters in her novel, including an American, Mrs. Hilton, who inspired Mrs. Hubbard.

Adaptations

Radio
John Moffatt starred as Poirot in a five-part BBC Radio 4 adaptation by Michael Bakewell, directed by Enyd Williams, and originally broadcast from 28 December 1992 – 1 January 1993. André Maranne appeared as Bouc, Joss Ackland as Ratchett/Cassetti, Sylvia Syms as Mrs Hubbard, Siân Phillips as Princess Dragomiroff, Francesca Annis as Mary Debenham, and Peter Polycarpou as Dr Constantine.

In 2017, the streaming service Audible released another radio adaptation that featured Tom Conti as the voice of Poirot. The voice cast also featured Sophie Okonedo as Mary Debenham, Eddie Marsan as Ratchett/Cassetti, and narration from Art Malik.

The Soviet radio play was released in 1966. The voice cast featured Vsevolod Yakut as Poirot, Rostislav Plyatt as Colonel Arbuthnot, Maria Babanova as Hubbard, Oleg Yefremov as Hector McQueen, Leonid Kanevsky as Antonio Foscarelli, Angelina Stepanova as Princess Dragomiroff and Alexander Lazarev as Hardman.

Film

 Murder on the Orient Express (1974) 

The book was made into a 1974 movie directed by Sidney Lumet and produced by John Brabourne and Richard B. Goodwin; it was a critical and commercial hit. The film starred Albert Finney as Poirot, Martin Balsam as Signor Bianchi, George Coulouris as Dr Constantine, and Richard Widmark as Ratchett/Cassetti, with the remaining cast of suspects including Sean Connery (Arbuthnot), Lauren Bacall (Mrs Hubbard), Anthony Perkins (MacQueen), John Gielgud (Beddoes), Michael York (Count Andrenyi), Jean-Pierre Cassel (Pierre Michel), Jacqueline Bisset (Countess Andrenyi), Wendy Hiller (Princess Dragomiroff), Vanessa Redgrave (Mary Debenham), Rachel Roberts (Hildegarde Schmidt), Colin Blakely (Hardman), Denis Quilley (Foscarelli), and Ingrid Bergman, who won the 1974 Academy Award for Best Supporting Actress for her role as Greta Ohlsson. Only minor changes were made for the film: Masterman was renamed Beddoes, the dead maid was named Paulette instead of Susanne, Helena Goldenberg became Helena Grünwald (which is German for "Greenwood"), Antonio Foscarelli became Gino Foscarelli, Caroline Martha Hubbard became Harriet Belinda Hubbard, and the train company's Belgian/Flemish director, Monsieur Bouc, became instead an Italian director, Signor Bianchi.

 Murder on the Orient Express (2017) 

On 16 June 2015, 20th Century Fox hired Kenneth Branagh to direct and star as Poirot in another film adaptation of the story, which was released on 3 November 2017. On 29 September 2016, the studio issued a press release announcing much of the cast, including Johnny Depp as Ratchett, Michelle Pfeiffer as Mrs Hubbard, Penélope Cruz as Pilar Estravados (a Spanish version of Greta Ohlsson, the name coming from a character in Hercule Poirot's Christmas), Judi Dench as Princess Dragomiroff, Derek Jacobi as Masterman, Leslie Odom Jr. as Dr Arbuthnot, Daisy Ridley as Mary Debenham, Lucy Boynton as Countess Andrenyi, Tom Bateman as Monsieur Bouc, Manuel Garcia-Rulfo as Biniamino Marquez (a Cuban version of Antonio Foscarelli), Josh Gad as Hector MacQueen, Marwan Kenzari as Pierre Michel, Sergei Polunin as Count Andrenyi, Willem Dafoe as Cyrus Hardman, and Olivia Colman as Hildegarde Schmidt. The character of Col. Arbuthnot is combined with Dr. Constantine to create Dr Arbuthnot, a sniper who served under Col. Armstrong in the war and had his medical school paid for by Armstrong; MacQueen's father is portrayed as having been a prosecutor in the Armstrong case rather than the Armstrong family's lawyer, and whose career was ruined after he prosecuted the maid Susanne; and Monsieur Bouc is changed from the director of the company to the director's nephew. Added was a direct link for Poirot to the Armstrong kidnapping—before Sonia's death, John Armstrong wrote to Poirot for help. Also unlike the book, the kidnapping does not take place in Long Island but in New Jersey, where the Lindbergh Kidnapping took place. Susanne Michel is switched from Pierre Michel's daughter to his sister. Cyrus Hardman poses as an Austrian scientist named Gerhard Hardman for part of the film. The last scene also sets up Death on the Nile as a sequel.

Television
German adaptation (1955)
The novel was first adapted as a 1955 episode of the West German television series Die Galerie der großen Detektive.  played the role of Poirot.

Murder on the Orient Express (2001)

A thoroughly modernized and poorly received made-for-TV version starring Alfred Molina as Poirot was presented by CBS in 2001. This version co-starred Meredith Baxter as Mrs Hubbard and Leslie Caron as Señora Alvarado (based on Princess Dragomiroff, and portrayed as the widow of a South American dictator). Poirot is portrayed as significantly younger and less eccentric than Christie's detective, and is given a subplot involving a romantic relationship with Vera Rosakoff, who is loosely based on an infrequently recurring character of the same name. The story is updated to a contemporary setting, and four of the suspects (Hildegarde Schmidt, Cyrus Hardman, Edward Masterman and Greta Ohlsson) are deleted, as is Dr Constantine.

Agatha Christie's Poirot: "Murder on the Orient Express" (2010)
David Suchet reprised the role of Hercule Poirot in "Murder on the Orient Express" (2010), a 90-minute movie-length episode of the television series Agatha Christie's Poirot co-produced by ITV Studios and WGBH-TV, adapted for the screen by Stewart Harcourt. The original air date was 11 July 2010 in the United States, and it was aired on Christmas Day 2010 in the UK.

The cast includes Dame Eileen Atkins as Princess Dragomiroff, Hugh Bonneville as Masterman, Jessica Chastain as Mary Debenham, Barbara Hershey as Mrs Hubbard, Toby Jones as Ratchett, and David Morrissey as Colonel Arbuthnot.

The character Cyrus Hardman (the former American police officer turned private detective) has been largely amalgamated with the chauffeur Foscarelli (in as much as regards being the lover of the dead maid) and Dr Constantine (who in the novel is unrelated to the murders) becomes a co-conspirator, depicted as having been the Armstrong family's doctor in America.

As in the 2017 film, MacQueen's father was the prosecutor rather than the Armstrongs' lawyer, whose career was ruined after he was threatened into acquitting Cassetti. The adaptation's treatment of Ratchett's murder is much darker in comparison with the novel. The killers gather in his cabin and stab him one by one while he is drugged but awake, rather than stabbing him independently while he is unconscious. The ending dwells on Poirot's horror at the act of mob justice and his moral conflict, in view of his Catholic faith and commitment to the law, when he decides not to tell the Yugoslavian police what he knows.

The interior of the Orient Express was reproduced at Pinewood Studios in London, while other locations include the Freemason Hall, Nene Valley Railway, and a street in Malta (shot to represent Istanbul).

Japanese TV adaptation (2015)
A Japanese adaptation was broadcast over two nights in January 2015 on Fuji Television, titled , and it featured several famous actors, including Ninomiya Kazunari, Matsushima Nanako, Tamaki Hiroshi, Kichise Michiko, Nishida Toshiyuki, and Sawamura Ikki. The main character, Suguro Takeru, modeled on Hercule Poirot, was played by actor Nomura Mansai.

The first night featured a storyline true to the original text, but set in Japan in 1933. In this version, the train Orient Kyuukou ran from the western city of Shimonoseki to Tokyo, with the train stopped by a small avalanche near Sekigahara, Gifu.

The second night was an original story.

Stage
American playwright Ken Ludwig adapted the novel into a play, which premiered at the McCarter Theatre in Princeton, New Jersey on March 14, 2017. The production was directed by Emily Mann, and starred Allan Corduner in the role of Hercule Poirot.

Games

A board game based on the novel named Orient Express was released in 1985. The point and click computer game Agatha Christie: Murder on the Orient Express was released in November 2006 for Windows and expanded on Agatha Christie's original story with a new playable central character as Hercule Poirot (voiced by David Suchet) is ill and recovering in his train compartment.

Publication history
 1934, Collins Crime Club (London), 1 January 1934, Hardcover, 256 pp.
 1934, Dodd Mead and Company (New York), 1934, Hardcover, 302 pp.
 c.1934, Lawrence E. Spivak, Abridged edition, 126 pp.
 1940, Pocket Books (New York), Paperback, (Pocket number 79), 246 pp.
 1948, Penguin Books, Paperback, (Penguin number 689), 222 pp.
 1959, Fontana Books (Imprint of HarperCollins), Paperback, 192 pp.
 1965, Ulverscroft Large-print Edition, Hardcover, 253 pp. 
 1968, Greenway edition of collected works (William Collins), Hardcover, 254 pp.
 1968, Greenway edition of collected works (Dodd Mead), Hardcover, 254 pp.
 1974, Pocket Books (New York) (with cover illustration of the cast of Sidney Lumet's movie by Allan Mardon [misspelled "Marden"]) November 1974, 34th printing, Paperback, viii, 198 p.
 1978, Pocket Books (New York), Paperback
 2006, Poirot Facsimile Edition (Facsimile of 1934 UK first edition), 4 September 2006, Hardcover, 256 pp. 
 2011, William Morrow (HarperCollins), Paperback, 265 pp.

The story's first true publication was the US serialisation in six instalments in the Saturday Evening Post from 30 September to 4 November 1933 (Volume 206, Numbers 14 to 19). The title was Murder in the Calais Coach, and it was illustrated by William C. Hoople.

The UK serialisation appeared after book publication, appearing in three instalments in the Grand Magazine, in March, April, and May 1934 (Issues 349 to 351). This version was abridged from the book version (losing some 25% of the text), was without chapter divisions, and named the Russian princess as Dragiloff instead of Dragomiroff. Advertisements in the back pages of the UK first editions of The Listerdale Mystery, Why Didn't They Ask Evans, and Parker Pyne Investigates claimed that Murder on the Orient Express had proven to be Christie's best-selling book to date and the best-selling book published in the Collins Crime Club series.

 See also 
 Baron Hotel – where Christie  wrote the first part of the novel
 Pera Palace Hotel – where Christie supposedly wrote the novel, although this is not stated in either her official biography or her own Autobiography''
 Venice-Simplon Orient Express – the train using original carriages from the Orient Express on which Christie based her novel

Notes

References

External links 
Murder on the Orient Express at the official Agatha Christie website
"Agatha Christie and Archaeology: The Excavations at Nineveh, Arpachiyah, Chagar Bazar and Tell Brak; 1931–1939"—British Museum webpage on the Mallowans' work at Arpachiyah

 
1934 British novels
British novels adapted into films
Hercule Poirot novels
Novels set on trains
Novels set on the Orient Express
Works originally published in The Saturday Evening Post
Novels first published in serial form
Collins Crime Club books
British novels adapted into television shows
Novels set in the 1930s
Novels set in Yugoslavia
Fiction about child murder
Books about princesses